Lisa Callan is a Democratic member of the Washington Legislature representing the State's 5th House district for position 2. Callan has held office since 2019 after being elected in 2018 and re-elected in 2020.

Career
Callan has a bachelor's degree from Northern Arizona University in mathematics and computer science. She worked as an engineer at Boeing and then as a software developer in the technology sector. She served on the Issaquah School Board.

Callan won the general election in November 2018 to a secure a seat in the Washington House of Representatives. She secured fifty-two percent of the vote while her closest rival, Republican Paul Graves, secured forty-eight percent.

Callan won re-election to the State House on November 3, 2020.

References

Callan, Lisa
Living people
21st-century American politicians
21st-century American women politicians
Women state legislators in Washington (state)
1970 births